Jonathan Samuel Carroll (born January 26, 1949) is an American fiction writer primarily known for novels that may be labelled magic realism, slipstream or contemporary fantasy. He has lived in Austria since 1974.

Life and work 
Carroll was born in New York City to Sidney Carroll, a film writer whose credits included The Hustler, and June Carroll (née Sillman), an actress and lyricist who appeared in numerous Broadway shows and two films. He is the half brother of composer Steve Reich and nephew of Broadway producer Leonard Sillman. His parents were Jewish, but Carroll was raised in the Christian Science religion. A self-described "troubled teenager", he finished primary education at the Loomis School in Connecticut and graduated with honors from Rutgers University in 1971, marrying artist Beverly Schreiner in the same year. He relocated to Vienna, Austria a few years later and began teaching literature at the American International School, and has made his home in Austria ever since.

His first novel, The Land of Laughs (1980), is indicative of his general style and subject matter. Told through realistic first person narration, the novel concerns a young schoolteacher, Thomas Abbey, researching the life of a favorite children's book author of his youth, which involves meeting the author's daughter in her and her late father's seemingly idyllic (fictitious) home town of Galen, Missouri. Everything seems fine until a dog in Galen begins talking to Abbey. The line gradually blurs between the fantasy world created by Abbey's research subject and the life of the people in Galen, while the reader begins to wonder just how much trust can be placed in this narrator. Subsequent novels would expand on these themes, but often contain unreliable narrators in a world where magic is viewed as natural. (One commentator claimed in The Times that "if he were a Latin American writer with a three-part name, his books would be described as magical-realist".)

His son, Ryder Carroll, is the inventor of the Bullet Journal.

Awards
Carroll's short story, "Friend's Best Man", won the World Fantasy Award. His novel, Outside the Dog Museum won the British Fantasy Award and his collection of short stories won the Bram Stoker Award. The short story "Uh-Oh City" won the French Grand Prix de l'Imaginaire. His short story "Home on the Rain" was chosen as one of the best stories of the year by the Pushcart Prize committee. Carroll has been a runner-up for other World Fantasy Awards, the Hugo, and British Fantasy Awards.

Bibliography

Novels
 The Land of Laughs (1980)
 Voice of Our Shadow (1983)
The Answered Prayers Sextet
 Bones of the Moon (1987) (slightly revised US edition, 1988)
 Sleeping in Flame (1988) – World Fantasy Award nominee, 1989
 A Child Across the Sky (1989, Washington Post Book of the Year) – BSFA nominee, 1989; WFA and Clarke nominee, 1990
 Outside the Dog Museum (1991) – British Fantasy Award winner, WFA nominee, 1992
 After Silence (1992)
 From the Teeth of Angels (1994) – New York Times Book Review Notable Book; WFA nominee, 1995
 The Crane's View Trilogy
 Kissing The Beehive (1997) – British Fantasy Award nominee, 1999
 The Marriage of Sticks (2000) – British Fantasy Award nominee, 2000
 The Wooden Sea (2001, New York Times Book Review Notable Book) – Locus and World Fantasy Awards nominee, 2002
 White Apples (2002) – Locus and World Fantasy Awards nominee, 2003
 Glass Soup (2005)
 Oko Dnia (Eye of the Day) (2006, Polish language edition)
 The Ghost in Love (2008)
 Bathing the Lion (2014)
 Mr. Breakfast (2019, Polish Language edition) (2020, Italian Language edition) (TBP Jan 17 2023, English Language edition)

Novellas and short novels
 Black Cocktail (1990)
 The Discovery of Running Bare (1992) [Included in Paul J. McAuley and Kim Newman's SF and Horror fiction anthology, In Dreams (Victor Gollancz Ltd, London). ]
 The Heidelberg Cylinder (2000) [1000 copy limited edition, signed by Jonathan Carroll and cover artist Dave McKean. A few remaining copies left over from the print run were sold without signatures.]
 Teaching the Dog to Read (2015)

Short story collections
 Die Panische Hand (1989) (German language edition)
 The Panic Hand (1995) [expansion of the 1989 German language edition; the 1996 US edition adds the novella Black Cocktail]
 The Woman Who Married A Cloud: Collected Stories (2012)

Nonfiction
The Crow's Dinner (2017)

Further reading
Edna Stumpf. "Jonathan Carroll: Galen to Vienna to the World". In Schweitzer, Darrell (ed). Discovering Modern Horror Fiction. Mercer Island, WA: Starmont House, 1985, pp. 129–34.

References

External links

Official website

1949 births
Living people
American expatriates in Austria
20th-century American novelists
American fantasy writers
Rutgers University alumni
World Fantasy Award-winning writers
21st-century American novelists
Jewish American novelists
American male novelists
American male short story writers
20th-century American short story writers
21st-century American short story writers
20th-century American male writers
21st-century American male writers
Loomis Chaffee School alumni
Weird fiction writers
21st-century American Jews